Timothy Lafaele  is an American Samoan-born, Japanese international rugby union player who plays as a fly-half or centre. He received Japanese citizenship in 2017.

Club career

Lafaele has played all of his senior rugby in Japan with the Coca-Cola Red Sparks, who he joined in 2014.

International

Lafaele received his first call-up for his adopted country Japan's senior squad ahead of the 2016 end-of-year rugby union internationals.

References

1991 births
Living people
American Samoan rugby union players
Japanese rugby union players
Japan international rugby union players
American Samoan expatriate sportspeople in Japan
Rugby union fly-halves
Rugby union centres
Coca-Cola Red Sparks players
Sunwolves players
Kobelco Kobe Steelers players
People from Pago Pago
American Samoan expatriates in New Zealand
Naturalized citizens of Japan
American Samoan expatriate rugby union players
Yamanashi Gakuin University alumni
Expatriate rugby union players in Japan